Yunmen Mountain is a mountain located in the town of Qingzhou, Weifang City, Shandong, China that has religious significance for Taoism and Buddhism.

Mountains of Shandong
Weifang